Jimmy Zámbó (born Imre Zámbó, 20 January 1958 – 2 January 2001) was a Hungarian pop singer. His nickname was "The King".

Career 
Zámbó started his singing career in the Hungarian State Radio Children's Choir. Between 1982 and 1986 he worked in the US on the club circuit before returning to Hungary. His breakthrough came in the early 1990s, when he was voted Hungary's singer of the year in 1993. His 2000 album Christmas With Jimmy had been Hungary's top-selling record for many weeks before his death. All his albums have gone platinum. Between March 2000 and his death he hosted his own popular show on commercial TV station RTL Klub.

Death 

Zámbó died on 2 January 2001, by a gunshot wound to the head. Budapest police said that he leaned out of a window and fired two shots from his 9 mm Beretta at a neighbor's rooster whose crowing was disturbing his sleep, in an effort to scare it away. Then, to show his wife that there were no more bullets in the gun, he removed the magazine, put it to his head and pulled the trigger. However, there was a bullet still in the chamber, which fired and struck him in the temple. He was taken to the hospital, where he died hours later. He had consumed alcohol, though not an excessive amount. No drugs were found in his body. It was ruled as an accidental death.

See also 
 Hungarian pop
 List of unusual deaths

References

External links 
 A Hungarian view, in English, of The King
 

1958 births
2001 deaths
Accidental deaths in Hungary
Deaths by firearm in Hungary
Firearm accident victims
20th-century Hungarian male singers
Hungarian pop singers
People from Budapest